The first third season of You Can Dance - Po prostu Tańcz. The dancers compete to win PLN 100,000 and a 3-month scholarship in dance school Broadway Dance Center, but first they have to go through auditions. Later, 36 contestants do the workshops abroad - this season in Barcelona, Spain. This seasons on choreography camp special guest choreographer was Brian Friedman. From sixteen people, two dancers are eliminated in each episode (In the semi-final episode there was one contestant eliminated). In every episode couples are randomly picked. The final episode that features the top three contestants. The show is hosted by Kinga Rusin. The judges are Agustin Egurrola, Michał Piróg and Weronika Marczuk-Pazura. It premiered on 10 September 2008. Wioletta Fiuk was announced as the winner on 3 December 2008.

Changes from Previous Season
 During choreography camp every dancer had to participate in Final Choreography Round with Special Guest Choreographer. Right after group danced the results were announced by judges. This solution is used in every next season.
 In Final episode there were two rounds: In first only two left men were competing. The winner joined the best female dancer in final round.

Auditions
Season Background Song: Destination Calabria - Alex Gaudino
Open auditions for this season were held in the following locations:
 Szczecin
 Kraków
 Wrocław
 Warszawa

The song during Sneek Peeks at the end of the episode is Just Lose It - Eminem

Top 36 dancers
During the auditions judges picked 36 dancers. These dancers were taking part in choreography camp in Barcelona, Spain.

These dancers were shown only in youcandance.tvn.pl website extras.
These dancers weren't shown anywhere.
These dancers earned the tickets after choreography round.

Returning Dancers
This season there were some returning dancers, who were trying their chances last seasons.

Choreography Camp (Barcelona) week 
Judges: Agustin Egurrola, Weronika Marczuk-Pazura, Michał Piróg

Eliminations during Choreography Camp

Dancers were practising choreographies during first three days of the Camp. Then there were no cuts, judges gave some dancers, who didn't handle the choreographies well yellow cards, second yellow equals red card.
After rehearsals contestants performed only in chosen by choreographer style, then judges made cuts.
After these cuts remaining contestants moved to Final Choreography round with special guest star Brian Friedman

Cuts after first round: Szymon Mazur, Iwona Tchórzewska, Aneta Bałoń, Agata Wiedro, Mariusz Swatek, Mieszko Wiśniewski, Jolanta Świerczyńska, Maciej Pela, Marcin Kowalski, Kamila Ganclarska, 
Cuts after Hip-Hop: Maciej Kuchta. 
Cuts after Final Choreography round: Jacek Suchecki, Robert Magiera, Tomasz Jóżwiak, Agnieszka Miś, Paweł Kulik, Klaudia Śnios, Agnieszka Gołofit.
Cuts after dancing for live: Kacper Matuszewski, 
Katarzyna Waligóra, Adrianna Piechówka.

Top 16 Contestants

Women

Men

Elimination chart

Performance nights

Week 1: Top 16 Showcase (8 October 2008)

Group Dance: Yeah Yeah — Bodyrox feat. Luciana/Walk These Dogs - DMX (House/Hip-Hop; Choreographer: Filip Czeszyk)
Performances:

After Group performances Judges chose the best group and every person from this group had to perform their solo
Solos:

#After Voting these dancers will be safe in next episode

Week 2: Top 16 (15 October 2008)

Group Dance: Closer — Ne-Yo (Contemporary; Choreographer: Wojciech Mochiniej)
Top 16 Couple Dances:

Bottom 3 Couples solos:

Eliminated:
Barbara Derkowska
Błażej Górski

Week 3: Top 14 (22 October 2008)

Group Dance: Disturbia — Rihanna (Hip-Hop; Choreographer: Anthony Kaye)
Top 14 Couple dances:

Bottom 3 Couples solos:

Eliminated:
Klaudia Bryzek
Karol Niecikowski

Week 4: Top 12 (29 October 2008)

Group Performance: Just for Now — Imogen Heap (Modern Jazz; Choreographer: Katarzyna Kizior)
Top 12 Couple dances:

Bottom 3 Couples solos:

Eliminated:
Justyna Banasiak
Tomasz Prządka

Week 5: Top 10 (5 November 2008)

Group Performance: Womanizer — Britney Spears/Music For Twelve Sounds - Flykkiller (Contemporary; Choreographer: Michał Piróg)
Top 14 Couple dances:

Bottom 3 Couples solos:

Eliminated*:
Anita Florczak
Kamil Czarnecki

Week 6: Top 8 (12 November 2008)

Group Dances:

Top 8 Couple dances:

Bottom 3 Couples solos:

Eliminated:
Paulina Jaksim
Jakub Mędzycki

Week 7: Top 6 (19 November 2008)

Group Performance: Shut Up and Let Me Go - The Ting Tings (Jazz; Choreographer: Piotr Jagielski)
Top 6 Couple dances:

Top 6's solos:

Eliminated:
Izabela Orzełowska
Michał Pawłowski

Week 8: Semi-Finale - Top 4 (26 November 2008)

Group Performance: Mr. Sandman - The Chordettes (Hip-Hop); Choreographer: Rafał "Roofi" Kamiński (season 1)
Guest Dancers: Maria Foryś, Natalia Madejczyk, Rafał Kamiński (season 1) - Chop Suey - System of a Down/Trust a Try - Janet Jackson
Top 4 Couple dances:

Top 4's solos:

Eliminated:
Adrianna Kawecka

Week 9: Finale - Top 3 (2 December 2008)

Group dances:

Top 3 Couple dances:

Top Male Dancers solos:

Final Performance

Top 2 solos:

Results:
Winner: Wioletta Fiuk
Runner Up: Gabriel Piotrowski
3rd Place: Marcin Mrożiński

First for any So You Think You Can Dance series
On top 10 Ragga Jam was danced for the first time in series, by couple Wioletta Fiuk & Kamil Czarnecki.

First for You Can Dance - Po Prostu Tańcz!
 First ever Lyrical Hip-Hop performed by couple. Top 14 Wioletta Fiuk & Tomasz Prządka
 First ever Afro Jazz routine performed by couple. Top 14 Izabella Orzełowka & Jakub Mędrzycki
 First ever Krump routine performed by couple. Top 10 Adrianna Kawecka & Marcin Mrożiński
 First ever Ragga Jam routine performed in show. Top 10 Wioletta Fiuk & Kamil Czarnecki
 In finale there were two rounds. In first 2 males were competing to join top 2 along with the best female. It is controversial, because, that day there were two rounds of voting. After first the winner male votes weren't counted in next round, where he had to compete with top female dancer.

Rating Figures

External links
So You Think You Can Dance Poland Official Website

Season 03